Qasbinə is a village and municipality in the Balakan Rayon of Azerbaijan.  It has a population of 2,110.  The municipality consists of the villages of Qasbinə and Qaracabinə.

References 

Populated places in Balakan District